Zhang Kangyang or Steven Zhang (born 21 December 1991) is a Chinese businessman and chairman of the Italian football club Inter Milan.

Biography
Born in Nanjing, Zhang is the son of Chinese billionaire Zhang Jindong, founder and chairman of the Suning Holdings Group. He was featured in Fortune China magazine's "40 Under 40" list.

As the President of Suning International, Steven Zhang has the ultimate responsibility for spearheading the business's international expansion and future ambitions. Suning International is part of Suning Holdings Group – the commercial giant ranked second among the top 500 non-state owned enterprises in China and list of largest private non-governmental companies by revenue with annual revenues of RMB 665.3 billion (approximately US$103 billion).

They are also the owners of Suning.com, a smart retail subsidiary currently ranked China's most valuable retail brand and listed on the Fortune Global 500 List of the world's largest companies  for three successive years, with a total brand value of RMB 269.198 billion and an operating income in excess of US$39 billion.

Football

Inter Milan 
In October 2018, Steven Zhang became the youngest ever chairman of Football Club Internazionale Milano S.p.A., known as Inter Milan (or simply Inter). Having been instrumental in Suning Holdings Group's acquisition of Inter in 2016, he then held a position on the Board and took over the management of operations for the club.

In 2019, Inter's enterprise value rose over 41% to EUR 692 million, the highest growth of any club in Europe. Inter is also ranked in the Top 10 for Club Stadia (Venue Performance).

In February 2020, Inter Milan sued Major League Soccer's Inter Miami CF for trademark infringement, stating that the term "Inter" is synonymous with its club and no one else. , the case continues.

In April 2020, Zhang heavily criticized Paolo Dal Pino on Instagram, the president of Serie A, over his handling of the COVID-19 outbreak among footballers and clubs. Unpopular with multiple Serie A club owners and not just Inter for general incompetence, Dal Pino would eventually resign in February 2022 after two years in charge.

In July 2022, media reported that the Hong Kong High Court handed down its summary judgement against Zhang for unpaid (USD)$225m debt, Zhang’s liability for unpaid $225m debt raises questions over Inter Milan’s future.

Silverware successes
During the 2019–20 season, Inter finished 2nd in the league and finished as runners-up in the final of the 2019–20 UEFA Europa League – the club's best performance in Europe since their 2009–10 UEFA Champions League victory.

As chairman, Inter returned to winning trophies after having won the 2020–21 Serie A with four days to spare, the nineteenth championship in the history of the club and 11 years after the last triumph in 2009–2010. Zhang became the first foreign owner to win the Scudetto in Italy and the first Chinese owner to win a domestic top-division European club championship.

On 12 January 2022, Inter Milan won the Italian Super Cup, the second trophy of Zhang's chairmanship. On 11 May, Inter Milan won the Coppa Italia, the third trophy under his management.

During the 2022-23 season, he returned to win the second consecutive Italian Super Cup, on the King Fahd International Stadium in Riyadh, Saudi Arabia, it is the fourth trophy in his management and he is now placed fourth on the Club's honours board for the number of trophies won as President.

Member of the European Club Association 
Since March 2018 Steven Zhang has been on the UEFA Club Competitions Committee and is the only member from Asia. From September 2019, he was a member of the European Club Association (ECA) Executive Board. the body established in 2008 and recognised by UEFA and FIFA, representing the interests of professional association football clubs in Europe. He is the first Chinese representative among 24 members of the Board. Zhang resigned from it in April 2021.

References

Living people
1991 births
Businesspeople from Nanjing
Sportspeople from Nanjing
Chinese football chairmen and investors
Inter Milan chairmen and investors
Wharton School of the University of Pennsylvania alumni